Charles Albert Aaron Morgan (27 January 189727 November 1967) was an Australian politician.

Career
Born in Woonona, New South Wales, he was educated at Catholic schools and then at Sydney Technical College. He became a solicitor in 1920 and eventually a Labor lawyer. In 1940, he was elected as the Labor candidate for the Australian House of Representatives seat of Reid, held by Lang Labor MP Joe Gander. Morgan defeated Gander and held the seat until his defeat by Jack Lang himself in 1946; Morgan's defeat was largely because the Liberal Party directed its preferences to Lang. In 1949, however, Lang contested the new seat of Blaxland instead of Reid, and Morgan regained the seat.

Fitzpatrick-Browne case

In 1955, Morgan complained to the House of Representatives that his integrity and ability to perform his parliamentary duties were inhibited by claims made in the Bankstown Observer, a free newspaper circulated in his electorate.  The matter was referred to the Committee of Privileges, and the proprietor of the newspaper, Raymond Fitzpatrick, and its editor, Frank Browne, were called before the Bar of the House. After hearing statements from both men, the House sentenced them to 90 days jail.

Morgan held the seat until 1958, when he lost his Labor pre-selection to Tom Uren and unsuccessfully contested the seat as an independent. Morgan died in 1967.

Personal life
Morgan's son Kevin Morgan served in the New South Wales Legislative Assembly from 1953 to 1956, during his father's term as a federal MP.

References

 

Australian Labor Party members of the Parliament of Australia
Members of the Australian House of Representatives for Reid
Members of the Australian House of Representatives
1897 births
1967 deaths
Independent members of the Parliament of Australia
20th-century Australian politicians